Federal Highway is a highway in New South Wales and the Australian Capital Territory. It is a part of a motorway-standard link between Sydney and Canberra, and is also the main thoroughfare between those cities.

Route
The roadway has a continuous  speed limit within New South Wales northbound. A southbound section between the Great Dividing Range, south of Yarra, and Rowes Lagoon, north of Collector, is on an old and winding alignment and has a speed limit of 100k/h with many lower advisory speed signs. The entire length of the roadway is dual carriageway with 2 lanes in each direction.

History
In New South Wales, the passing of the Main Roads Act of 1924 through the Parliament of New South Wales provided for the declaration of Main Roads, roads partially funded by the State government through the Main Roads Board (later the Department of Main Roads, and eventually Transport for NSW). The New South Wales section of Federal Highway was declared (as Main Road No. 3) on 8 August 1928, from its interchange with Hume Highway in Yarra, via Collector and Geary's Gap, to the interstate border; with the passing of the Main Roads (Amendment) Act of 1929 to provide for additional declarations of State Highways and Trunk Roads, this was amended to State Highway 3 on 8 April 1929. Construction had already been completed and traffic was already using the portion of the highway within New South Wales by December 1930.

In the Federal Capital Territory, the local Sydney-Canberra Road was officially declared part of Federal Highway in September 1928. Surveying and levelling had finished and work had started in April 1929 to connect to the NSW portion of the road, with the contract awarded to John Fowler (Aust) Ltd, to construct a 6-mile section of highway from Canberra (today Lyneham) to the interstate boundary. Approaching completion by February 1930, it was officially completed and opened on 25 February 1931.

The passing of the Roads Act of 1993 through the Parliament of New South Wales updated road classifications and the way they could be declared within New South Wales. Under this act, Federal Highway today retains its declaration as Highway 3, from Yarra to the interstate border with the ACT.

Federal Highway was allocated National Route 23 across its entire length in 1955. The Whitlam Government introduced the federal National Roads Act 1974, where roads declared as a National Highway were still the responsibility of the states for road construction and maintenance, but were fully compensated by the Federal government for money spent on approved projects. As an important interstate link between the capitals of New South Wales and the Australian Capital Territory, the Federal Highway was declared a National Highway in 1974 and was consequently re-allocated National Highway 23.  With the conversion to the newer alphanumeric system in 2013, this was replaced with route M23 across the New South Wales' section, and route A23 across the Australian Capital Territory's section; an eastern portion was upgraded to route M23 when Majura Parkway opened in 2016.

Junction list

See also

 Highways in Australia
 List of highways in New South Wales

References

External links

Highways in Australia
Highways in the Australian Capital Territory
Highways in New South Wales